Spinaeschna watsoni is a species of dragonfly in the family Telephlebiidae,
known as the tropical cascade darner. 
It is a medium to large, dark brown dragonfly with greenish-yellow markings.
It is endemic to north-eastern Australia, where it inhabits streams and rivers.

Gallery

See also
 List of Odonata species of Australia

References

Telephlebiidae
Odonata of Australia
Endemic fauna of Australia
Taxa named by Günther Theischinger
Insects described in 1982